China National Highway 208 (G208) runs from Erenhot, Inner Mongolia to Xichuan County, Henan province. It is 990 kilometres in length and runs south from Erenhot, via Shanxi towards Henan province.

Route and distance

See also
 China National Highways
 AH3

External links
Official website of Ministry of Transport of PRC

208
Transport in Shanxi
Transport in Inner Mongolia